"Ohne dich" is the third single from Christina Stürmer's fourth album, Lebe lauter, released in 2006. Translated, it means "Without You."

Music video 
The video starts with Stürmer on a boat in the middle of a lake. Her band members are shown up close playing the guitar. Throughout the video, shots of Stürmer on the boat are shown.

Charts and release history 
"Ohne dich" was released in Austria, Germany, and Switzerland. It reached number eight in the charts in Austria, number thirty-three in Germany, and number forty-seven in Switzerland.

2006 singles
Christina Stürmer songs